Penstemonia is a genus of moths in the family Sesiidae.

Species
Penstemonia clarkei Engelhardt, 1946
Penstemonia dammersi Engelhardt, 1946
Penstemonia edwardsii (Beutenmüller, 1894)
Penstemonia hennei Engelhardt, 1946
Penstemonia pappi Eichlin, 1987

References

Sesiidae